Marzia Gazzetta (Monselice, 31 August 1967) is an Italian former Middle distance runner.

Biography
In her career she won one time national championships on 1500 metres indoor (1991). She has 15 caps in national team.

National titles
 1 win in 1500 metres at the Italian Athletics Indoor Championships (1991)

References

External links
 

1967 births
Italian female middle-distance runners
Living people